Edward Bell (September 20, 1921 – December 6, 1990) was an American guard and tackle in the National Football League.

Biography
Bell was born in Chicago, Illinois.

Career
Bell's first professional experience was with the Miami Seahawks of the All-America Football Conference. Following his time there, he played with the Green Bay Packers for three seasons.

He played at the collegiate level at Indiana University.

See also
List of Miami Seahawks players
List of Green Bay Packers players

References

1921 births
1990 deaths
Players of American football from Chicago
Miami Seahawks players
Green Bay Packers players
American football offensive guards
Indiana Hoosiers football players